Camelia-Elena Hristea (born 3 February 1991) is a Romanian former tennis player.

On 25 October 2010, she reached her highest WTA doubles ranking of 457.

Hristea made her WTA Tour debut at the 2015 Bucharest Open in the doubles main draw, partnering Cristina Dinu.

ITF Circuit finals

Singles: 2 (1–1)

Doubles: 34 (14–20)

References

External links
 
 

1991 births
Living people
People from Caracal, Romania
Romanian female tennis players
21st-century Romanian women